SS Hjejlen (Danish for The Golden Plover) is one of the world's oldest operational paddle steamers,  built in 1861 by Baumgarten & Burmeister, commissioned by a group of citizens headed by paper manufacturer Michael Drewsen.  She is used to carry tourists between Silkeborg and Himmelbjerget, but in 1932 she also became a public mail boat.

Engine

==Hjejlen's 150th anniversary==
In 2011 Hjejlen'' celebrated her 150th anniversary with Queen Margrethe II in attendance. A commemorative coin was issued by the National Bank of Denmark.

See also
 Hjejleselskabet

References

Paddle steamers
Passenger ships of Denmark
1861 ships